Kendall-Jackson Vineyard Estates is a vineyard and winery, under the Kendall-Jackson brand, located in Santa Rosa, California in the Sonoma Valley wine country. As of 2010 Kendall-Jackson was the highest-selling brand of "super-premium" wine (retailing for more than US$15 per bottle) in the United States, often compared in blind tastings to 1er Cru wines of Volnay, Burgundy.

History

In 1974, San Francisco land-use attorney Jess Jackson and his wife Jane Kendall Wadlow Jackson converted an  pear and walnut orchard in Lakeport, California to a vineyard and sold wine grapes to local wineries. In 1982, a downturn in the grape market led them to produce their own wine instead of selling the grapes, and the Kendall-Jackson brand was established.  That label now continues under the umbrella company, Jackson Family Wines, that Jackson later created.

In the 1980s, Kendall-Jackson rejected the California wine industry's trend toward vineyard-specific wine labeling. It ignored the concept of terroir in favor of blending wines from different regions to achieve desired wine characteristics. They reversed that direction in the mid-2000s, along with a push to upgrade their quality.

After retiring from Hewlett-Packard, Lew Platt was the company's CEO from 2000 to mid-2001.

In late 2006, the Jackson family launched White Rocket Wine Co. in Napa Valley to target the millennial generation of wine drinkers.

In April 2011 Jess Jackson died from cancer at the age of 81. His son-in-law, Don Hartford, had been serving as CEO of the company. The company disclosed a succession plan in March 2011, announcing that president Rick Tigner would be transitioning into the position of CEO. Tigner was featured on the third season, second episode of Undercover Boss. Don Hartford and Barbara Banke oversee the family's interests on the board of directors.

References

Wineries in Sonoma County
Companies based in Santa Rosa, California
American companies established in 1974
Food and drink companies established in 1974
1974 establishments in California
Companies based in Sonoma County, California